Mohamad Hisyamudin bin Mohamad Sha'ari (born 5 September 1987) is a Malaysian footballer who plays for Malaysia Super League club UiTM as a centre-back.

Club career

UiTM
Hisyamudin was a product of Bukit Jalil Sports School, and later in the Kuala Lumpur youth team. He played a few times for the senior team of Kuala Lumpur, but later decided to quit professional football in 2007 to further his studies at Universiti Teknologi MARA, taking a Bachelor in Sports Science. While at UiTM, he does not abandon football completely as he represented UiTM Football Club, the university's football team, in a various amateur competition such as inter-varsity league and the Malaysia FAM Cup competition. He also represented for Malaysia University in 2010 ASEAN University Games at Chiang Mai, Thailand. In 2011, again he represented for Malaysia in World University that held in Shenzhen China.

Perak
Hisyamudin re-entry into professional football was unintentional. As he was searching for places to complete his industrial training for his studies, he attends the trial for Perak and was handed a senior contract for the 2011 season after completing the trial. This makes Perak as his first professional team, as he played before for Kuala Lumpur on a youth contract.

Kuala Lumpur FA
In November 2016, he returned to his former club, Kuala Lumpur.

UiTM FC
May 2021, he got call up for second window to his former club, UiTM FC.

International career

Youth
Hisyamudin has played for Malaysia U21 between 2004 and 2006. He was on the team that won the 2005 4-Nations invitational tournament in Hong Kong.

Senior
Hisyamudin was called for the Malaysia national team and selected as one of the starting players for Malaysia for the friendly match against Hong Kong on 3 June 2011. He made his debut for the national team in this match.

Career statistics

Club

International

References

External links
 
 
 Yob4Ever: Mengeteh bersame Hisyamudin Mohamed Sha’ari (Interview with Hisyamuddin Mohamed Sha'ari)

1987 births
Living people
Malaysian footballers
Malaysia international footballers
Perak F.C. players
Kuala Lumpur City F.C. players
Malaysian people of Malay descent
Sportspeople from Kuala Lumpur
Association football central defenders